A partial lunar eclipse took place on Friday, September 5, 1941. It was a shallow partial lunar eclipse, with less than 10% of the Moon covered in Earth's shadow.

Fortnight 

Aug 31, 1941 = Sunday

Sep  1, 1941 = Monday

Sep  2, 1941 = Tuesday 

Sep  3, 1941 = Wednesday 

Sep  4, 1941 = Thursday 

Sep  5, 1941 = Friday 

Sep  6, 1941 = Saturday

Sep  7, 1941 = Sunday

Sep  8, 1941 = Monday

Sep  9, 1941 = Tuesday

Sep 10, 1941 = Wednesday 

Sep 11, 1941 = Thursday 

Sep 12, 1941 = Friday

Sep 13, 1941 = Saturday

Visibility

Related lunar eclipses

Half-Saros cycle
A lunar eclipse will be preceded and followed by solar eclipses by 9 years and 5.5 days (a half saros). This lunar eclipse is related to two total solar eclipses of Solar Saros 124.

See also 
List of lunar eclipses and List of 21st-century lunar eclipses

References

External links 
 Saros series 117
 

1941-09
1941 in science